Omelchenko is a surname of Ukrainian origin

It may refer to:
 Aleksandr Omelchenko, Russian footballer
 Andriy Omelchenko, Ukrainian bandurist
 Igor Omelchenko, Soviet swimmer
 Oleksandr Omelchenko, former mayor of Kyiv
 Oleksiy Omel'chenko, Ukrainian footballer
 Valeriy Omelchenko, Ukrainian politician

See also
 

Ukrainian-language surnames